Nandipaku Venkataswamy is an Indian politician from Bharatiya Janata Party who served as Member of 13th Lok Sabha from Tirupati Lok Sabha constituency and State Vice President of Bharatiya Janta Party of Andhra Pradesh. He is the only winner of Bharatiya Janata Party from Tirupati Lok Sabha constituency. In 1999 Indian general election in Andhra Pradesh, he defeated Indian National Congress by a thin margin.

Personal life 
He was born on 5 June 1931 in Chittoor and married D. Savithri in 15 May 1963.

References 

Indian politicians
1931 births
People from Chittoor
India MPs 1999–2004
Members of Parliament from Andhra Pradesh
Living people